The Tale of Tillie's Dragon is an American animated film directed and written by Mike Stribling and animated by Steven Hahn. The film is about a little girl named Tillie who befriends a playful dragon named Herman. Together the two take part in a variety of adventures, including Tillie's struggle to protect her new friend from the people of her village, who view all dragons as fire-breathing man-eaters in need of extermination. The technical crew on this film featured a variety of former Disney employees.

Cast
Kath Soucie - Tillie
John Kassir - Herman
Wayne Powers - Uncle St. George
Frank Welker - Mayor Simmons/Narrator
Randy Rudy - Assistant Mayor Wilner
Russi Taylor - Pie Lady

Awards

In 1995, this film won an award in the category 'Best Animation Feature Film' and in 2000, director, Mike Stribling, won an award in the Burbank International Children's Film Festival.

References

External links

 
 
 

1995 films
1995 animated films
Animated films about dragons
1990s American animated films
1990s children's animated films
1990s English-language films